Viktor Sobolev may refer to:

 Viktor Sobolev (scientist) (1915–1999), Soviet and Russian scientist
 Viktor Sobolev (politician) (born 1950), Russian politician